Pyrgoi was a town of ancient Lycaonia, inhabited in Byzantine times. 

Its site is located near Kazımkarabekir, Asiatic Turkey.

References

Populated places in ancient Lycaonia
Former populated places in Turkey
Populated places of the Byzantine Empire
History of Karaman Province